Streptomonospora flavalba is a bacterium. Its type strain is YIM 91394T(=DSM 45155T=CCTCC AA 208047T).

Description
It is halophilic, aerobic, catalase-positive, oxidase-negative and Gram-positive.

References

Further reading
Whitman, William B., et al., eds. Bergey's manual® of systematic bacteriology. Vol. 5. Springer, 2012.

External links
LPSN
Type strain of Streptomonospora flavalba at BacDive -  the Bacterial Diversity Metadatabase

Actinomycetales
Bacteria described in 2009